Adelina Nicholls is a sociologist and one of the co-founders of the Georgia Latino Alliance for Human Rights (GLAHR). She advocates and protests for the protection and extension of rights for immigrants in America, with particular focus on those from Latin American countries. She marched in Atlanta, Georgia in protest against an immigration reform law, HB 87 in 2011. In addition to being opposed by Nicholls and GLAHR, the law was also protested by the Mexican government. She has also marched to the Immigration and Customs Enforcement (ICE) building in Atlanta.

She has collaborated with National Day Laborer Organizing Network. She has worked with the activists and police officers in Warner Robins, Perry City, Athens, Doraville, Forest Park, Fairburn, and Albany.

She attended the National Autonomous University of Mexico. She was a teacher in rural México before moving to the United States where she became a community organizer.

References 

Mexican sociologists
Mexican women sociologists
Living people
Year of birth missing (living people)
American activists of Mexican descent